The Colony of British Columbia refers to one of two colonies of British North America, located on the Pacific coast of modern-day Canada:

Colony of British Columbia (1858–1866)
Colony of British Columbia (1866–1871)

See also 
History of British Columbia